Ledford may refer to:

People
 Brandy Ledford (born 1969), American actress, model and Penthouse magazine's 1992 "Pet of the Year"
 Cawood Ledford (1926–2001), radio play-by-play announcer for the University of Kentucky
 Dwayne Ledford (born 1976), American football coach and former player
 Frank F. Ledford Jr. (1934–2019), American orthopedic surgeon
 Homer Ledford (1927–2006), instrument maker and bluegrass musician from Kentucky
 John Ledford (born 1969), American entrepreneur and producer
 Lily May Ledford (1917–1985), American clawhammer banjo and fiddle player
 Mark Ledford (1960–2004), American trumpeter, singer, and guitarist

Places
 Ledford Island, a site of the Mouse Creek phase archaeological culture of the Eastern Tennessee
 Ledford, Illinois, an unincorporated community in the Harrisburg Township, Saline County

Schools
 Ledford High School, a public high school in Thomasville, North Carolina
 Ledford Middle School, a public school in the Davidson County, North Carolina school district